The Pittsburgh Subdivision is a railroad line owned and operated by CSX Transportation in the U.S. state of Pennsylvania. The line runs from McKeesport northwest through Pittsburgh to West Pittsburg (near New Castle) along a former Pittsburgh and Lake Erie Railroad line. Its east end is at Sinns, across the Youghiogheny River from McKeesport at Liberty, at the west end of the Keystone Subdivision. It junctions with the Mon Subdivision at McKeesport and the P&W Subdivision in Rankin; at its west end it becomes the New Castle Terminal Subdivision. 

Amtrak's Capitol Limited uses the line southeast of Rankin.

History
The line northwest of Pittsburgh opened in 1879 as part of the Pittsburgh and Lake Erie Railroad. The rest of the line, southeast from Pittsburgh, was opened in 1883 by the Pittsburgh, McKeesport and Youghiogheny Railroad. The latter company was leased by the P&LE. In 1934, the Baltimore and Ohio Railroad began operating through trains via trackage rights over the P&LE between McKeesport (slightly north of the current beginning of the Pittsburgh Subdivision until the bridge at Sinns opened in 1968) and New Castle, leaving the P&W Subdivision for local trains only. Eventually the P&LE, which had been jointly owned by CSX and Conrail, was merged into CSX.

See also
Pittsburgh and Lake Erie Railroad
List of CSX Transportation lines

References

CSX Transportation lines
Rail infrastructure in Pennsylvania
Pittsburgh and Lake Erie Railroad